Lisa Urech (born 27 July 1989) is a retired Swiss track and field athlete who specialised in the 100 metres hurdles. She holds the national record in the 100 metres hurdles since 2011.  After several injury-plagued years, Urech declared her retirement from competitive athletics in 2016.

Competition record

Personal bests
Outdoor
 100m hurdles – 12.62 (2011 La Chaux-de-Fonds)

Indoor
 60m hurdles – 8.00 (2011 Karlsruhe)

References

External links
 

1989 births
Living people
Swiss female hurdlers
Place of birth missing (living people)